Credit Call was an English racehorse who won 37 National Hunt steeplechases up to 1976. He was a gelding, originally owned by Chris Collins and trained by [William] Arthur Stephenson. Collins won 27 races before selling the horse to Ursula "Urkie" Newton. Collins rode most wins himself as an amateur jockey, but in the 1971 Horse and Hound Cup he was injured and Graham Macmillan rode. Newton's son Joey rode him to four wins in eight starts in 1975. In 1976 Urkie took over as trainer, and Joey had six more wins. The Credit Call Cup is awarded for the Novices' Hunters' Chase at Stratford, commemorating Credit Call's four victories in the Horse and Hound Cup.

References

Citations

Cheltenham Festival winners
National Hunt racehorses
Racehorses bred in the United Kingdom
Racehorses trained in the United Kingdom
1964 racehorse births
Thoroughbred family 4-k